Hellinsia paleaceus is a moth of the family Pterophoridae described by Philipp Christoph Zeller in 1873. It is found in North America, including Florida, Mississippi Maryland, Montana, Texas, California, Nebraska, New Mexico and south-eastern Canada. It has also been recorded from Puerto Rico.

Adults have been recorded from March to September.

The larvae feed on Vernonia gigantea, Vernonia missurica, Vernonia noveboracensis, Vernonia angustifolia, Vernonia blodgettii and Vernonia cinerea (Cyanthillium cinereum). They feed on the young foliage of their host plant. Young larvae are dingy white, with a tinge of green. Later instars become pale glaucous, often varying, especially in the late fall brood, to dull salmon. Pupation takes place in a pupa with quite variable colour and markings. In the spring brood, it is commonly dull green, with indistinct yellow lateral stripes. In the fall brood, the dorsum is pale yellow or flesh color, with two fine indistinct mediodorsal lines of lilac color. The pupa is quite active and irritable, striking about in all directions when meddled with.

References

paleaceus
Moths described in 1873
Moths of North America